

Incumbents
Emperor: Hirohito
Prime Minister: Shigeru Yoshida
Chief Cabinet Secretary: Kaneshichi Masuda until May 6, Katsuo Okazaki
Chief Justice of the Supreme Court: Tadahiko Mibuchi until March 2, Kōtarō Tanaka from March 3
President of the House of Representatives: Kijūrō Shidehara
President of the House of Councillors: Naotake Satō

Governors
Aichi Prefecture: Hideo Aoyagi 
Akita Prefecture: Kosaku Hasuike 
Aomori Prefecture: Bunji Tsushima 
Chiba Prefecture: Tamenosuke Kawaguchi (until 25 October); Hitoshi Shibata (starting 15 December)
Ehime Prefecture: Juushin Aoki 
Fukui Prefecture: Harukazu Obata 
Fukuoka Prefecture: Katsuji Sugimoto 
Fukushima Prefecture: Sakuma Ootake (starting 28 January)
Gifu Prefecture: Kamon Muto 
Gunma Prefecture: Yoshio Iyoku
Hiroshima Prefecture: 
 until 29 November: Tsunei Kusunose 
 29 November-25 December: Tetsuo Wakuda
 starting 25 December: vacant
Hokkaido Prefecture: Toshifumi Tanaka
Hyogo Prefecture: Yukio Kishida 
Ibaraki Prefecture: Yoji Tomosue 
Ishikawa Prefecture: Wakio Shibano 
Iwate Prefecture: Kenkichi Kokubun
Kagawa Prefecture: Keikichi Masuhara (until 25 July); Masanori Kaneko (starting 11 September)
Kagoshima Prefecture: Kaku Shigenari 
Kanagawa Prefecture: Iwataro Uchiyama 
Kochi Prefecture: Wakaji Kawamura 
Kumamoto Prefecture: Saburō Sakurai 
Kyoto Prefecture: Atsushi Kimura (until 2 April); Torazō Ninagawa (starting 20 April)
Mie Prefecture: Masaru Aoki
Miyagi Prefecture: Kazuji Sasaki 
Miyazaki Prefecture: Tadao Annaka 
Nagano Prefecture: Torao Hayashi 
Nagasaki Prefecture: Sōjirō Sugiyama 
Nara Prefecture: Mansaku Nomura 
Niigata Prefecture: Shohei Okada 
Oita Prefecture: Tokuju Hosoda 
Okayama Prefecture: Hirokichi Nishioka 
Osaka Prefecture: Bunzō Akama 
Saga Prefecture: Gen'ichi Okimori 
Saitama Prefecture: Yuuichi Oosawa
Shiga Prefecture: Iwakichi Hattori 
Shiname Prefecture: Fujiro Hara 
Shizuoka Prefecture: Takeji Kobayashi 
Tochigi Prefecture: Juukichi Kodaira 
Tokushima Prefecture: Goro Abe 
Tokyo Prefecture: Seiichirō Yasui 
Tottori Prefecture: Aiji Nishio 
Toyama Prefecture: Kunitake Takatsuji 
Wakayama Prefecture: Shinji Ono 
Yamagata Prefecture: Michio Murayama 
Yamaguchi Prefecture: Tatsuo Tanaka 
Yamanashi Prefecture: Katsuyasu Yoshie

Events
January 1: The old practice of advancing one's age every New Year's Day (regardless of one's date of birth) is replaced by the western style of advancing one's age on each anniversary of one's date of birth. Under the old system, someone born on November 1, for example, would turn one on January 1, two months later.
February 11: According to Japan National Police Agency official confirmed report, a regular route bus plunge into ravine in Hōtaku District, Kumamoto Prefecture, (now Kumamoto City), Kyushu Island, 22 persons were lost to lives, 31 persons were hurt.
July 5: Bandaiya, later Bandai Namco Holdings founded in Asakusa, Tokyo.
July 7: Kinkaku-ji in Kyoto is burned to the ground by a 22-year-old novice monk.
September 4: Typhoon Jane, tidal wave and flash flood hit around Osaka Bay, official death toll was 539 persons, with 26,062 persons were wounded, according to Japanese government official confirmed report.
September 14: Typhoon Kezia, tidal wave hit around Island Sea of Seto, with lost Kintai Bridge and Miyajima Torii gate. According to Japan Fire and Disaster Management Agency official confirmed report, 49 persons were fatalities, 35 persons were hurt. 
November 7: According to JNPA official confirmed report, a regular route bus plunge into Monobe River, Mirabu, (now Kami, Kochi), Shikoku Island, 34 persons were human fatalities and 29 persons were wounded.    
December 12: Hayato Ikeda, future Prime Minister of Japan, remarks in the National Diet that "the poor should eat barley".
December 20: A dormitory of Okayama Prfectural Deaf School fire, according to JFDMA official announced, 16 persons were lost to lives in Okayama City.
Undated:
Tenshi Junior College is founded in Sapporo.

Births
 February 20 - Ken Shimura, television performer and actor (d. 2020)
 March 31 - Yoshifumi Kondō, animator (d. 1998)
 April 5 - Toshiko Fujita, voice actress (d. 2018)
 April 21 - Tatsumi Kimishima, businessman
 August 10 - Tetsuo Gotō, voice actor (d. 2018)
September 8 - Naoki Tatsuta, voice actor
 September 14 - Masami Kuwashima, race car driver
 September 27 - Cary-Hiroyuki Tagawa, actor
 October 2 - Tetsuo Gotō, politician (d. 2018)
 October 12 - Kaga Takeshi, actor
 October 16 – Yasunori Oshima, former professional baseball player and coach (d. 2021)
 November 12 - Hideyuki Tanaka, voice actor and narrator

Deaths
 January 17 - Seiichi Hatano, philosopher
 July 23 - Shigenori Tōgō
 November 3 - Kuniaki Koiso, Prime minister

See also
 List of Japanese films of 1950

References

 
1950s in Japan
Years of the 20th century in Japan